Mount Grafton Wilderness is a  wilderness area in southern White Pine County and northern Lincoln County, in the U.S. state of Nevada.

The high point and namesake of the Wilderness is  Mount Grafton, a peak in the Schell Creek Range and important summer habitat for many species of wildlife including elk, mule deer, Rocky Mountain bighorn sheep, and mountain lion.  Extensive forested areas of Mount Grafton Wilderness include pinyon pine, juniper, aspen, limber and bristlecone pine, and white fir.

See also
 List of wilderness areas in Nevada
 List of U.S. Wilderness Areas
 Wilderness Act

References

External links
 Friends of Nevada Wilderness - Mount Grafton Wilderness
  - Mount Grafton Wilderness Area fact sheet

Wilderness areas of Nevada
Protected areas of Lincoln County, Nevada
Protected areas of White Pine County, Nevada
IUCN Category Ib
Bureau of Land Management areas in Nevada